Thomas Griffin (January 1, 1889 – September 29, 1915) and Meeks Griffin were brothers and prominent black farmers who lived in Chester County, South Carolina. They were executed via the electric chair in 1915 for the murder in 1913 of 75-year-old John Q. Lewis, a Confederate veteran of Blackstock, South Carolina. The Griffin brothers were convicted based on the accusations of another black man, John "Monk" Stevenson, who was known to be a small-time thief. Stevenson, who was found in possession of the victim's pistol, was sentenced to life in prison in exchange for testifying against the brothers. Two other African Americans, Nelson Brice and John Crosby, were executed with the brothers for the same crime. However, some in the community believed that the murder might have been the result of Lewis's suspected sexual relationship with 22-year-old Anna Davis. Davis and her husband were never tried, possibly for fear of a miscegenation scandal. The Griffin brothers, who were believed to be the wealthiest black people in the area, sold their  farm to pay for their defense against the accusations.

Over 100 people petitioned Gov. Richard Manning to commute the brothers' sentence. The signatories included Blackstock's mayor, a sheriff, two trial jurors and the grand jury foreman. Nevertheless, they were sent to the electric chair. Thomas Griffin and Meeks Griffin were pardoned in October 2009 after Tom Joyner sought the pardons of his great-uncles from state appeals court in Columbia, South Carolina.

Joyner learned about his relationship to the Griffins through research conducted for the PBS documentary, African American Lives 2, by Harvard scholar Henry Louis Gates Jr., which also traced 11 other relatives.

Their case was dramatized in the 2021 supernatural horror film, Blackstock Boneyard. In said film, they return from the grave one hundred years later to take revenge on the descendants of the people responsible for their deaths.

See also
List of wrongful convictions in the United States
Wrongful executions in the United States

References

African-American farmers
19th-century American farmers
American people convicted of murder
Executed African-American people
People convicted of murder by South Carolina
People executed by South Carolina by electric chair
People executed for murder
People who have received posthumous pardons
Recipients of American gubernatorial pardons
20th-century executions by South Carolina
20th-century executions of American people
Wrongful executions
Farmers from South Carolina
People from Chester County, South Carolina
20th-century African-American people
20th-century American farmers